WGMP (1170 AM, 104.9 The Gump) is an alternative rock formatted radio station that serves the Montgomery Metropolitan Area, in Alabama, United States, broadcasting on the AM band at a frequency of 1170 KHz and via a broadcast translator on the FM band at 104.9 MHz.

The station's "104.9 The Gump" branding features the frequency of its broadcast translator, W285AJ, rather than its licensed AM frequency. The station is locally owned and operated by Bluewater Broadcasting Company, LLC. The station's studios are located on Wall St. in Midtown Montgomery.  The transmitter for WGMP is north of the city, while the translator's transmitter is in midtown near Greenwood Cemetery.

WGMP participates in Montgomery rating survey by Arbitron (Market #150) and is monitored by Mediabase.

History
The station first hit the airwaves in January 1939 as WJJJ, owned by George William "Will" Covington, Jr.  (1170 AM is the second-oldest frequency in use in the Montgomery market, the oldest being 1440 kHz, which began as WSFA, later became WHHY, and finally WLWI.) It broadcast from studios in the Excelsior Hotel in downtown Montgomery.  In 1948, Covington changed the call letters to WCOV, naming it after himself.  It would eventually spawn Montgomery's first television station, which still has the WCOV-TV call letters.

Covington died in 1949, and his family kept the station until selling it to Gay-Bell Corporation in 1964, earning a substantial return on their investment of 25 years earlier.  The station changed its call letters to WACV in November 1984, after Gay-Bell sold it.  As WACV, it adopted a talk radio format.

In March 2004, Montgomery Broadcast Properties Ltd. (Allan Stroh, CEO) reached an agreement to sell this station to Bluewater Broadcasting LLC. The sale was part of a four-station deal valued at a reported $15.3 million. The deal was approved by the FCC on April 21, 2004, and the transaction was completed on June 21, 2004. At the time of the sale, WACV was broadcasting a news/talk format.

In late March 2009, WACV began simulcasting on WJAM-FM as "News Talk 107.9 FM". On Thursday, April 2, 2009, the FM station changed its calls to WMRK-FM, and WACV became known as "News Talk 107.9, WMRK-FM". The original lineup included news from Bob Jackson, with updates from WAKA CBS8. Locally originated programs, such as "Viewpoint", continued on "News Talk 107.9" with Dan Morris and Mark Montiel, and Greg Budell continued "Happy Hour". Nationally syndicated talk programming features Laura Ingraham, Glenn Beck, Rusty Humphries, Jerry Doyle, Roy Masters, and Neal Boortz.

In November 2009, the news/talk programming was re-branded and moved to WMRK-FM as part as of an LMA with Alexander Communications. WACV changed formats to oldies music and branded itself as "Good Time Oldies WACV". This format was short-lived and on July 30, 2010, WACV changed its format again to alternative rock and re-branded itself as "104.9 The Gump".

On August 13, 2012, the station changed its call sign to WGMP.

This station was reported to be off the air in April 2017; it has been running on a special temporary authority antenna since December 2016 due to lightning damage to their daytime transmitter.  As such, if they are on the air at all, they are only operating at 4 watts. On April 12, 2017, the station was granted a Federal Communications Commission construction permit to simplify their transmitter setup significantly, decreasing from 10 kW to 850 watts daytime and from a directional antenna to a non-directional antenna. Nighttime power will increase from 4 watts to 7 watts.

Programming
WGMP plays mostly Alternative Rock, and plays many Modern Rock songs. Core artists include: Foo Fighters, The Black Keys, Green Day, Pearl Jam, Weezer, Red Hot Chili Peppers, Blink 182, Cake, Seether, Soundgarden, Janes Addiction, Linkin Park, Neon Trees, Metallica, Garbage, The Offspring, Bush, and more. WGMP also features news and weather updates from CBS 8 WAKA, and traffic from Montgomery Skywatch Traffic.

There are no disc jockeys, but rather, non-stop music with limited breaks for commercials and station identifications.

Technical information
WGMP broadcasts with a Continental Electronics transmitter at 10,000 watts (daytime) into a two-tower AM directional array.  It powers down to 4 watts at night to protect KTSB in Tulsa and WWVA in Wheeling, West Virginia.

Translators
WGMP programming is also carried on a low-powered FM broadcast translator, mainly to improve the station's nighttime coverage.  The AM transmitter's four-watt nighttime signal renders it barely listenable even in Montgomery.

References

External links
WGMP official website
W285AJ coverage map

Bluewater Broadcasting Company, LLC

GMP
Modern rock radio stations in the United States
Radio stations established in 1939
1939 establishments in Alabama